Sainte-Colombe-sur-l'Hers (literally Sainte-Colombe on the Hers; Languedocien: Santa Colomba d'Ers or Santa Colomba d'Èrs) is a commune in the Aude department in southern France.

Population

See also
Communes of the Aude department

References

Communes of Aude
Aude communes articles needing translation from French Wikipedia